Rafael Portillo (1916–1995) was a Mexican film director, screenwriter and film editor.

Selected filmography

Director
 The Ghost Falls In Love (1953)
 A Life in the Balance (1955)
 The Aztec Mummy (1957)
 The Curse of the Aztec Mummy (1957)
 The Robot vs. The Aztec Mummy (1958)
 Music and Money (1958)
 Carnival Nights (1978)
 The Loving Ones (1979)
 Midnight Dolls (1979)

Editor
 The Hour of Truth (1945)
 The Bewitched House (1949)
 Full Speed Ahead (1951)
 What Has That Woman Done to You? (1951)
 Kill Me Because I'm Dying! (1951)
 Girls in Uniform (1951)
 Mexican Bus Ride (1952)

References

Bibliography
 Charles Ramírez Berg. Cinema of Solitude: A Critical Study of Mexican Film, 1967-1983. University of Texas Press, 2010.

External links

1916 births
1995 deaths
Mexican film editors
Film directors from Mexico City
Writers from Mexico City
Mexican male writers
Male screenwriters
20th-century Mexican screenwriters
20th-century Mexican male writers